Dóra Ólafsdóttir (6 July 1912 – 4 February 2022) was an Icelandic centenarian. On 13 December 2021, she became the oldest Icelander ever, breaking Jensína Andrés­dótt­ir's record of 109 years and 159 days.

Biography
Dóra was born on 6 July 1912 on Sigtún at Kláströnd in Grýtubakkahreppur in Iceland. At the age of six, she witnessed the 1918 major eruption of Katla. She studied at Gagnfræðaskólinn á Akureyri and later moved to Copenhagen in Denmark. After moving back to Iceland, Dóra worked for Landssíminn for 40-years. Dóra was married to Þórir Áskels­son from 15 February 1943 until his death in December 2000. Together they had two children. In 2012, she moved to Kópavogur to live with her son for a short while. She became the oldest living Icelander in 2019 following the death of Jensína Andrés­dótt­ir. Dóra died on 4 February 2022, at the age of 109.

References

1912 births
2022 deaths
Icelandic centenarians
Women centenarians